Gohiner Gaan is a 2019 Bangladeshi musical film. The film written and directed by Sadat Hossain and produced by Enamul Haque under the banner of Bangladhol. The film stars Asif Akbar and Toma Mirza played lead roles and Syed Hasan Imam, Tanzika Amin, Aman Reza and Quazi Asif Rahman played supporting roles in the film. It is the first feature musical film of Bangladesh.

Cast 
 Asif Akbar
 Syed Hasan Imam
 Tanzika Amin
 Toma Mirza
 Aman Reza
 Quazi Asif Rahman
 Tulona Al Harun
 Arosh (child artist)
 Mugdhota Morshed (child artist)

Soundtrack

Release 
The film was release in 13 theatres on December 20, 2019.

References

External links 
 

2019 films
Bengali-language Bangladeshi films
2010s musical films
2010s Bengali-language films